John Lowell (1743–1802), also known as The Old Judge, was a U.S. Federal Judge appointed by George Washington

John Lowell is also the name of:
 John Lowell (minister) (1704–1767), early Massachusetts minister
 John Lowell Jr. (lawyer) (1769–1840), aka The Boston Rebel, Federalist lawyer and son of The Old Judge
 John Lowell Jr. (philanthropist) (1799–1836), son of Industrialist Francis Cabot Lowell and founder of the Lowell Institute
 John Amory Lowell (1798–1881), businessman and philanthropist
 John Lowell Gardner II (1837–1898), American businessman, art collector, and philanthropist
 John Lowell (judge, 1865–1884) (1824–1897), Federal judge and son of John Amory Lowell
 John Lowell (actor) (1875–1937), American actor in Arizona Days
 John W. Lowell (born 1962), American playwright
 John Lowell (businessman), son of Ralph Lowell, trustee of the Lowell Institute
 John Lowell (quarterback), of the 2008 Boston College Eagles football team

See also
 Lowell family, one of the Boston Brahmin families of New England